The Wolf Prize is an international award granted in Israel, that has been presented most years since 1978 to living scientists and artists for "achievements in the interest of mankind and friendly relations among people ... irrespective of nationality, race, colour, religion, sex or political views."

History

The prize is awarded in Israel by the Wolf Foundation, founded by Ricardo Wolf, a German-born inventor and former Cuban ambassador to Israel. It is awarded in six fields: Agriculture, Chemistry, Mathematics, Medicine, Physics, and an Arts prize that rotates between architecture, music, painting, and sculpture. Each prize consists of a diploma and US$100,000. The awards ceremony typically takes place at a session in the Knesset.  The prize is described by the Foundation as being "awarded annually", but is not in fact awarded every year: between 2000 and 2010, only six prizes were awarded in most fields, and only four in Physics.

The Wolf Prizes in physics and chemistry are often considered the most prestigious awards in those fields after the Nobel Prize. The prize in physics has gained a reputation for identifying future winners of the Nobel Prize – from the 26 prizes awarded between 1978 and 2010, fourteen winners have gone on to win the Nobel Prize, five of those in the following year.

In medicine, the prize is probably the third most prestigious, after the Nobel Prize and the Lasker Award. Until the establishment of the Abel Prize, the Wolf Prize was probably the closest equivalent of a "Nobel Prize in Mathematics", since the more prestigious Fields Medal was only awarded every four years to mathematicians under forty years old. In agriculture, the prize has likewise been equated to a "Nobel Prize in Agriculture".

The most recent Wolf Prize was awarded in June 2022 to:

 Agriculture—Pamela Ronald “for pioneering work on disease resistance and environmental stress tolerance in rice”.
 Chemistry—Bonnie L. Bassler, Carolyn R. Bertozzi, and Benjamin F. Cravatt III “for their seminal contributions to understanding the chemistry of cellular communication and inventing chemical methodologies to study the role of carbohydrates, lipids, and proteins in such biological processes”. 
 Mathematics—George Lusztig “for groundbreaking contributions to representation theory and related areas”.
 Physics—Paul Corkum, Ferenc Krausz, and Anne L'Huillier “for pioneering contributions to ultrafast laser science and attosecond physics”.
 Architecture—Yoshiharu Tsukamoto and Momoyo Kaijima “for their work that highlights the importance to Architecture of its ethnographic and inhabitational characteristics, in their writings and practice”, and Elizabeth Diller “for her exceptional and influential work connecting architecture to artistic practice, engaged in the public domain”.

Laureates per country 
Below is a chart of all laureates per country (updated to 2023 laureates). Some laureates are counted more than once if have multiple citizenship.

See also

 Lists of art awards
 List of general science and technology awards
 List of mathematics awards

References

External links

 
Israeli awards
International awards
Awards established in 1978
1978 establishments in Israel